"Wash It All Away" is a song by American heavy metal band Five Finger Death Punch, from their sixth studio album Got Your Six. It was released in October 2015 as the second single from the album.

Charts

References 

Five Finger Death Punch songs
2015 songs
2015 singles
Reprise Records singles
Song recordings produced by Kevin Churko
Songs written by Kevin Churko
Songs written by Zoltan Bathory
Songs written by Ivan Moody (vocalist)
Songs written by Jason Hook
Songs written by Jeremy Spencer (drummer)